RLG may refer to:

 Research Libraries Group, a former U.S.-based library consortium
 Ring laser gyroscope
 Rostock Laage Airport (IATA airport code)
 Royal Lao Government